Anna Klemens (1718–1800) was a Danish murder victim and an alleged witch. She was lynched and accused of sorcery in Brigsted at Horsens in Denmark, a lynching considered to be the last witch lynching in her country and, most likely, in all Scandinavia.

Long after the legal courts in Denmark stopped executing witches after the execution of Anne Palles and Johan Pistorius, the belief led to private trials and lynching of alleged witches during the 18th century. In the countryside in Øster Grønning in Salling in 1722, the villagers apprehended a woman, Dorte Jensdatter, whom they suspected of having caused several deaths and problems in the village by magic, and held a private witch trial. When they were convinced, they tied her up in her own home and burned the house down with her in it. Several of the villagers were later sentenced to death for her murder. Klemens' was the last of these lynch cases.  

Klemens was a beggar who consulted a cunning woman together with several other people. When she entered the room, the "Wise One" pointed at her and cried out: "Here we have the master of all the witch craft!" She ordered six of the men present to beat Klemens up, as it was the belief that the magic of a witch left her when her blood had been spilt. The people gathered obeyed her, out of fear and respect for the wisdom and judgement of the "wise one", and Klemens died of the abuse. The cunning woman was executed for the murder and the men were banished.

See also 
 Dummy, the Witch of Sible Hedingham
 Krystyna Ceynowa
 Barbara Zdunk

References 
 
 Uwe Brodersen: Jordemødre, Hekse og Kloge Koner (Midwives, witches and cunning women) (In Danish)
 Marijke Gijswijt-Hofstra, Brian P. Levack, Roy Porter, Bengt Ankarloo: Witchcraft and magic in Europe

1718 births
1800 deaths
Lynching deaths
Beggars
Danish murder victims
People murdered in Denmark